Michał Sokołowski (born 11 December 1992) is a Polish professional basketball player for Beşiktaş Emlakjet of the Basketbol Süper Ligi (BSL). Sokołowski usually plays as small forward.

Professional career
Sokołowski started playing professionally for Anwil Włocławek in 2011–12 season. He stayed with the club for three seasons and signed with Rosa Radom in 2014. He won the PLK Best Defender award twice while playing with Rosa Radom, in 2015–16 and 2016–17 season. He was also named the PLK Best Polish Player in season 2017–18.

He signed with Zielona Góra for 2018–19 season. He was named once again the PLK Best Polish Player for season 2018–19.

In July 2019, Sokołowski signed with his former club Anwil Włocławek. He averaged 5.3 points and 3.3 rebounds per game. On 24 August 2020 he signed with Legia Warszawa of the Polish Basketball League.

On 16 October 2020, soon after the beginning of the 2020–21 season, he signed with Universo Treviso Basket in the Italian Serie A.

In May 2021, he signed in Israel for Hapoel Holon.

He returned to Treviso for the 2021–22 season with a two-year contract.

On January 18, 2023, he signed with Beşiktaş Emlakjet of the Basketbol Süper Ligi (BSL).

Career statistics

National team

References

External links
 Michał Sokołowski at eurobasket.com
 Michał Sokołowski at fiba.com
 Michał Sokołowski at plk.pl

1992 births
Living people
2019 FIBA Basketball World Cup players
Basket Zielona Góra players
Basketball players from Warsaw
Beşiktaş men's basketball players
KK Włocławek players
Legia Warsaw (basketball) players
Polish expatriate basketball people in Italy
Polish men's basketball players
Rosa Radom players
Small forwards
Universo Treviso Basket players